Michael Anthony Bell II (born August 10, 1983), known professionally as Tone Bell, is an American stand-up comedian and actor.

Early life

Bell was born in Decatur, Georgia. He taught first grade before working on the production of HBO's Warm Springs and doing other various promo work.

Bell took a job in San Francisco as a brand manager with Swivel Media for a year, before moving back to Atlanta. There he started doing promotion work for a beer company that eventually transferred him to Dallas where he started doing open-mics at various comedy clubs.

Career
Shortly after moving to Los Angeles, Bell won the NBC Stand Up For Diversity Talent Search in 2012 and was awarded a development deal from the network. He was cast as "RJ" the bartender in the NBC sitcom Whitney and later as "Tedward" in NBC's Bad Judge. Bell also appeared in other TV shows, including VH1's Single Ladies, E!'s Love You, Mean It with Whitney Cummings, Comedy Central's Key and Peele and Game Show Network's Mind of a Man and hosted the first season of hidden camera show Jerks with Cameras on MTV.

Bell also has a web series on Russell Simmons' YouTube channel All Def Digital called The Green Room.

In March 2018, Bell was cast in a lead role for the CBS comedy pilot Fam after having starred in the Netflix multi-camera comedy Disjointed.

Bell is the host of the new Netflix reality show Drink Masters, which premiered October 28, 2022.

Filmography

Films

Television series

References

External links
Official website

1983 births
Living people
American male film actors
American male television actors
American male voice actors
American stand-up comedians
African-American male comedians
American male comedians
African-American game show hosts
African-American male actors
Male actors from Atlanta
People from Decatur, Georgia
21st-century American comedians
21st-century African-American people
20th-century African-American people